Pseudobombax guayasense is a species of plant in the family Malvaceae. It is endemic to Ecuador.  Its natural habitat is subtropical or tropical dry forests. It is threatened by habitat loss.

References

Endemic flora of Ecuador
guayasense
Data deficient plants
Taxonomy articles created by Polbot